Marshall Jones Beverley (August 26, 1911 – June 14, 2000) was a banker and Mayor of Alexandria, Virginia in the 1950s.

Early life and family
Beverley was born August 26, 1911, in Alexandria, Virginia.  The son of Richard H. Carter Beverley, Sr. and Elizabeth Winter Jones, Beverley was a cousin of long-time Virginia Senator Harry F. Byrd, Sr.  He was a banker with the Washington, DC-based Riggs National Bank from 1929 to 1935 and then joined Alexandria's Burke and Herbert Bank.

Beverley entered the military in 1938 as a member of the U.S. Naval Reserve and was commissioned an officer in the U.S. Navy on Dec. 10, 1941. A veteran of World War II, he left the service with the rank of lieutenant commander.

In 1947, Beverley married Janet deNeale English; they had four children: Janet deNeale Beverley, Barbara Beverley, Marshall J. Beverley, Jr. and Richard Byrd Beverley.

Political service
Beverley was elected a member of the Alexandria City Council in 1949 and was elected mayor as a Democrat from 1951 - 1955.

He was named to the Board of Visitors of Mount Vernon in 1964 and served on the board until 1995.

Later life and death
Beverley served as a federal bank examiner for the Federal Reserve Bank and later retired as Senior Vice President of United Virginia Bank in 1976. The Beverleys retired to Berkeley County, West Virginia and he died in Martinsburg, West Virginia in 2000.

References

1911 births
2000 deaths
Mayors of Alexandria, Virginia
Virginia Democrats
American Presbyterians
United States Navy officers
American bankers
United States Navy personnel of World War II
Politicians from Martinsburg, West Virginia
Virginia city council members
Beverley family of Virginia